The 1977–78 Los Angeles Kings season was the Kings' 11th season in the National Hockey League.

Offseason

Regular season

Final standings

Schedule and results

Playoffs

Player statistics

Awards and records

Transactions
The Kings were involved in the following transactions during the 1977–78 season.

Trades

Free agent signings

Draft picks
Los Angeles's draft picks at the 1977 NHL amateur draft held at the Mount Royal Hotel in Montreal, Quebec.

Farm teams

See also
1977–78 NHL season

References

External links

Los Angeles Kings seasons
Los Angeles Kings
Los Angeles Kings
Los
Los